The Hill of Dreams is a semi-autobiographical novel by the Welsh writer Arthur Machen.

Plot summary

The novel recounts the life of a young man, Lucian Taylor, focusing on his dreamy childhood in rural Wales, in a town based on Caerleon. The Hill of Dreams of the title is an old Roman fort where Lucian has strange sensual visions, including ones of the town in the time of Roman Britain. Later, the novel describes Lucian's attempts to make a living as an author in London, enduring poverty and suffering in the pursuit of art and history.

Literary significance and criticism
The Hill of Dreams was little noticed on its publication in 1907 save in a glowing review by Alfred Douglas. It was actually written between 1895 and 1897 and has elements of the style of the decadent and aesthetic movement of the period, seen through Machen's own mystical preoccupations.

Lord Dunsany admired The Hill of Dreams and wrote an introduction to a 1954 reprint of the novel. In Henry and June, Henry Miller tells Anaïs Nin about The Hill of Dreams.

According to the Friends of Arthur Machen website, the novel is

References

External links

 
 
 

1907 British novels
Anglo-Welsh novels
British autobiographical novels
Novels set in Wales
Newport, Wales
Works by Arthur Machen